Emiliano Gómez may refer to:

Emiliano Gómez (Mexican footballer) (born 1991)
Emiliano Gómez (Uruguayan footballer) (born 2001)
Emiliano Gómez (Colombian footballer)